Asher Hale-Bopp Joseph Arthur Hart (born 30 March 1997) is an English cricketer. He made his first-class debut on 2 April 2017 for Hampshire against Cardiff MCCU as part of the Marylebone Cricket Club University fixtures.

Having previously been a part of the Durham academy side, Hart joined Hampshire ahead of the 2017 season. He made his List A debut for Hampshire in the 2017–18 Regional Super50 on 3 February 2018.

References

External links
 

1997 births
Living people
English cricketers
Hampshire cricketers
Sportspeople from Carlisle, Cumbria
Cricketers from Cumbria
Northumberland cricketers